Avanti (in Italian, meaning 'ahead', 'forward', or 'before', and also an unrelated Sanskrit name) may refer to:

Vehicles
 Studebaker Avanti, a model of automobile built by Studebaker
 Avanti II, a successor model made by Avanti Motor Corporation
 Avanti Kart, a racing go-kart manufactured in Italy by JM Racing
 DC Avanti, Indian designed sports car from DC Design
 Piaggio P.180 Avanti, a business aircraft

Companies
Avanti (bicycle company), a New Zealand-based bicycle manufacturer
Avanti Communications, a satellite broadband provider
Avanti Corporation, an electronic design automation company

Avanti West Coast, a British train operating company which operates the West Coast Main Line franchise
AvantiGas, a UK based energy supplier
Vertriebscenter Avanti, an Austrian chain of gas stations

Places
 Avanti (Ancient India), a historic kingdom in India
 Ujjain, also known as Avanti, the capital of the Avanti Kingdom

Other
 Avanti (label), a sub-label from Black Hole Recordings
 Avanti (project), a UK Government-sponsored construction collaboration project
 Avanti Racing Team, an Australian UCI Continental cycling team
 Avanti Schools Trust, a sponsor of state-funded Hindu schools in the UK
 Avanti, a 2012 album by Biel Ballester Trio
 Avanti!, a 1972 film
 Avanti! Chamber Orchestra, a Finnish chamber orchestra
 Avanti! (newspaper), the official newspaper of the Italian Socialist Party
 Avanti! Avanti!, a German educational television series
Avanti un altro!, an Italian game show, and Avanti ¡que pase el siguiente!, the name of the Spanish, Chilean and Paraguayan versions